is a Japanese retired professional wrestler. He is also a former All Japan Pro Wrestling Triple Crown Heavyweight Champion, a former GHC Heavyweight Champion and has had fourteen 5 Star Matches as awarded by the Wrestling Observer Newsletter.

Early life and sumo career

On the 8th of May, 1961 Akira Taue was born the eldest son of a construction worker, in Saitama, Japan. As a teenager and young adult in Kagemori Junior High School, Taue was quite active in various sports such as shotput, baseball and judo. After graduating, Taue would work as a part time auto-mechanic, while attending the Saitama Prefectural Chichibu High School. There Taue was sent a recommendation for the high school's sumo club. He joined the club in his second year of high school, and he won the third place in the national sumo high school championship.

Taue was then invited in the Oshiogawa stable, and made his professional sumo debut, in January 1980. For the first six years of Taue's sumo career he went under his real name, until May 1986, when he was promoted to the rank of jūryō, he was given the shikona of Tamakirin Yasumasa. He fought in the second highest jūryō division for seven tournaments before retiring from sumo in July 1987.

Professional wrestling career

All Japan Pro Wrestling (1988–2000)
After his debut, Taue would mostly wrestle in the tag team division of AJPW. During this time he along with Shinichi Nakano would win the All Asia Tag Team Championship belts on June 5, 1990. After many from All Japan's roster would leave for Genichiro Tenryu's new promotion, the SWS, Taue would band with Mitsuharu Misawa, Kenta Kobashi and Toshiaki Kawada to form the Super Generation Army. Soon after their formation, Taue would defect to Jumbo Tsuruta's stable, otherwise known as Tsuruta-gun. The ensuing rivalry between the Super Generation Army and Tsuruta-gun would produce all time tag team, and 6-man tag team classic matches. On September 30, 1990, the Wrestling Observer Newsletter would award Taue and Tsuruta versus Misawa and Kawada, 5 stars.

However, he became better known for tag team wrestling. He won his first championship, the All Asia Tag Team Championship, with Shinichi Nakano on June 5, 1990. He won the World Tag Team Championship for the first time on March 4, 1992, teaming with Jumbo Tsuruta. He formed a tag team with Toshiaki Kawada, called The Holy Demon Army, a team which ended up holding the World Tag Team Championship 6 times. The team split when Taue left AJPW for Mitsuharu Misawa's new Pro Wrestling Noah promotion in August 2000, while Kawada decided to stay.

Pro Wrestling Noah (2000–2017)
In Noah Taue continued tag team wrestling, teaming mostly with Takuma Sano. On November 5, 2005, Taue was able to defeat Takeshi Rikio with his Ore ga Taue finisher to capture the GHC Heavyweight Championship, which he held into the new year before losing it to Jun Akiyama on January 22, 2006.

On June 27, 2009, following the June 13 death of Mitsuharu Misawa, Akira Taue was appointed as the new president of Pro Wrestling Noah. On May 12, 2013, Taue announced that he would be officially retiring from the ring in December. On December 7, 2013, Taue wrestled his retirement match, where he, Takeshi Morishima, Takashi Sugiura, and Genba Hirayanagi defeated Genichiro Tenryu, Tatsumi Fujinami, Masao Inoue, and Kentaro Shiga, with Taue pinning Inoue for the final win of his career.

Taue served as the Noah president until November 1, 2016, when the company was sold to IT development company Estbee, after which he was given the new role of an advisor. He would resign from his position in February 2017.

Retirement
In June 2017, after studying with Mitsuhiro Matsunaga, Taue opened his own steakhouse in Tsukuba, Ibaraki, Japan, called Steak Izakaya Champ, where he personally cuts and cooks the steak, as well as greeting customers.

On August 22, 2018, Taue announced at a press conference that he was battling stomach cancer. The diagnosis came from when he was originally hospitalized from a fall at his home on March 2 that caused bleeding from the stomach, which required an emergency blood transfusion. He also revealed that on April 16, he underwent a gastrectomy after discovering the cancer during an examination.

Championships and accomplishments
All Japan Pro Wrestling
All Asia Tag Team Championship (1 time) – with Shinichi Nakano
Triple Crown Heavyweight Championship (1 time)
World Tag Team Championship (7 times) – with Jumbo Tsuruta (1) and Toshiaki Kawada (6)
Champion Carnival (1996)
World's Strongest Tag Determination League (1996, 1997) – with Toshiaki Kawada
January 2 Korakuen Hall Heavyweight Battle Royal (1992)
World Tag Team Championship Tournament (2000) – with Toshiaki Kawada
Nikkan Sports
Fighting Spirit Award (2005)
Pro Wrestling Illustrated
Ranked No. 33 of the top 500 singles wrestlers of the "PWI Years" in 1997
Ranked No. 115 of the top 500 singles wrestlers in the "PWI Years" in 2003
Ranked No. 8 of the 100 best tag team of the "PWI Years" with Toshiaki Kawada
Pro Wrestling Noah
GHC Heavyweight Championship (1 time)
Tokyo Sports
Fighting Spirit Award (1992, 1996)
Lifetime Achievement Award (2014)
Match of the Year (1995) – with Toshiaki Kawada vs. Mitsuharu Misawa and Kenta Kobashi on June 9, 1995
Tag Team of the Year (1997) – with Toshiaki Kawada
Wrestling Observer Newsletter awards

5 Star Match (1990) with Jumbo Tsuruta and Masanobu Fuchi vs. Mitsuharu Misawa, Toshiaki Kawada and Kenta Kobashi on October 19
5 Star Match (1991) with Jumbo Tsuruta and Masanobu Fuchi vs. Mitsuharu Misawa, Toshiaki Kawada and Kenta Kobashi on April 20
5 Star Match (1992) with Jumbo Tsuruta and Masanobu Fuchi vs. Mitsuharu Misawa, Toshiaki Kawada and Kenta Kobashi on May 22
5 Star Match (1993) with Toshiaki Kawada and Yoshinari Ogawa vs. Mitsuharu Misawa, Kenta Kobashi and Jun Akiyama on July 2
5 Star Match (1993) with Toshiaki Kawada vs. Mitsuharu Misawa and Kenta Kobashi on December 3
5 Star Match (1994) with Toshiaki Kawada and Masanobu Fuchi vs. Mitsuharu Misawa, Kenta Kobashi & Giant Baba on February 13
5 Star Match (1994) with Toshiaki Kawada vs. Mitsuharu Misawa & Kenta Kobashi on May 21
5 Star Match (1995) with Toshiaki Kawada vs. Mitsuharu Misawa & Kenta Kobashi on January 24
5 Star Match (1995) vs. Mitsuharu Misawa on April 15
5 Star Match (1995)  with Toshiaki Kawada vs. Mitsuharu Misawa and Kenta Kobashi on June 9
5 Star Match (1995) with Tamon Honda and Toshiaki Kawada vs. Mitsuharu Misawa, Kenta Kobashi and Satoru Asako on June 30
5 Star Match (1996) with Toshiaki Kawada vs. Mitsuharu Misawa & Jun Akiyama on May 23
5 Star Match (1996) with Toshiaki Kawada vs. Mitsuharu Misawa & Jun Akiyama on December 6
5 Star Match (1997) with Toshiaki Kawada vs. Mitsuharu Misawa & Jun Akiyama on December 5
Wrestling Observer Newsletter Hall of Fame (Class of 2022) with Toshiaki Kawada

Sumo career record

References

External links
Profile at Online World of Wrestling
Profile at Green Destiny
Cagematch profile

1961 births
Japanese male professional wrestlers
Japanese sumo wrestlers
Living people
Professional wrestling executives
Sportspeople from Saitama Prefecture
GHC Heavyweight Champions
All Asia Tag Team Champions
World Tag Team Champions (AJPW)
Triple Crown Heavyweight Champions